Elections to the Legislative Assembly of Sind were held in January and February 1937. These were the first elections in the province after its creation in 1936. The Communal Award of 1932 had allocated sixty assembly seats to Sind, based on which it now formed an assembly of its own.

The seats were divided amongst the following electoral colleges; Muslims Rural 31 seats, Muslims Urban 2 seats, Women Muslim Urban 1 seat, General Rural 15 seats, General Urban 3 seats, Women General Urban 1 seat, Europeans 2 seats, Landowners 2 seats, Commerce and Industry 2 seats and Labour 1 seat. In total, there were 639,043 eligible voters.

The Sind United Party won twenty-two of the Muslim seats, the Sind Muslim Political Party won four seats 4 whilst the Sind Azad Party won three seats. The party identity of one Muslim delegate was unclear. Independent candidates won the remaining nine seats from the Muslim constituencies.

In the General constituencies, the Sind Hindu Mahasabha won eleven seats, the Congress Party eight seats, Independent Hindus two seats and Independent Labour Party one seat. From the European and Commercial and Industry constituencies, non-party candidates were elected.

However, whilst the Sind United Party had emerged as the winner of the election its two most prominent leaders (Haji Abdullah Haroon and Shah Nawaz Bhutto) had failed to win the seats they contested. Haroon had contested the Lyari constituency, in northern Karachi. The Lyari seat was won by Sardar Allah Baksh Gabol. The Larkana seat, which Bhutto had contested, was won by Sheikh Abdul Majid Sindhi.

After the election the governor of Sind asked the leader of the Sind Muslim Political Party to form a cabinet. Largescale defections took place from the ranks of the Sind United Party and the Sind Azad Party in the assembly.

United Party senior leader Allah Bux Soomro later served as Premier of Sindh from March 23, 1938 – April 18, 1940 until a no-confidence motion was passed against him by the Indian National Congress and Muslim League. He was briefly elected back to power and served briefly from March 27, 1942 – October 14, 1942, but was dismissed by the Governor due to his support for the Quit India Movement.

Winning members

References

Elections in Sindh
1937 elections in India
Politics of Sindh
Sind